UFC on FX: Guillard vs. Miller (also known as UFC on FX 1) was a mixed martial arts event held by the Ultimate Fighting Championship on January 20, 2012 at the Bridgestone Arena in Nashville, Tennessee.

Background

The event was the second to be broadcast as part of a seven-year agreement between the UFC and Fox, and the inaugural event to air on FX.

The UFC's second announce team made their debut at this event, featuring former Bellator announcer Jon Anik on play-by-play and UFC lightweight Kenny Florian on color commentary. Anik and Florian had previously worked together as hosts of the ESPN2 series MMA Live.

A featherweight bout between Charles Oliveira and Robert Peralta was briefly linked to this event, but it was later confirmed that Oliveira would instead be facing Eric Wisely a week later at UFC on Fox: Evans vs. Davis.

Rafaello Oliveira was expected to fight Reza Madadi at the event. However, after a hand injury, Oliveira pulled out of the bout and was replaced by Fabrício Camões. Madadi would later withdraw from the bout due to injury as well and was replaced by promotional newcomer Tommy Hayden.

Mike Brown was expected to face Vagner Rocha, but was forced out of the bout with an injury. Rocha will instead face Jonathan Brookins at UFC on Fuel TV 1.

Ken Stone was expected to fight Mike Easton at this event, but was forced from the bout due to injury and replaced by promotional newcomer Jared Papazian.

UFC newcomer Ryan Jimmo was expected to face Karlos Vemola at this event, but the bout was cancelled after Jimmo fell injured a week prior to the event.

This event featured the UFC debut of future UFC Lightweight Champion Khabib Nurmagomedov.

The preliminary card aired on Fuel TV.

Results

Bonus awards

The following fighters were awarded $45,000 bonuses.

 Fight of the Night: Pat Barry vs. Christian Morecraft
 Knockout of the Night: Nick Denis
 Submission of the Night: Jim Miller

See also
List of UFC events
2012 in UFC

References

UFC on FX
2012 in mixed martial arts
Mixed martial arts in Tennessee
Sports competitions in Nashville, Tennessee
2012 in sports in Tennessee
Events in Nashville, Tennessee